Romina is a 1980 Argentine telenovela starring Amelia Bence, Dora Baret, and Arturo Bonín.

References

Argentine telenovelas
1980 telenovelas
1980 Argentine television series debuts
1980 Argentine television series endings
Spanish-language telenovelas
Televisión Pública original programming